Milutinović is a Serbo-Croatian surname, a patronymic derived from Milutin. It may refer to:

 Andreja Milutinović (born 1990), Serbian basketball player.
 Bora Milutinović (born 1944), Serbian football coach.
 Ivan Milutinović (1901–1944), Serbian Partisan.
 Ivica Milutinović (born 1983), Serbian footballer.
 Lazar Milutinović (born 1998), Serbian footballer.
 Maja Milutinović (born 1987), Montenegrin basketballer.
 Milan Milutinović (born 1942), former President of Serbia.
 Milan Milutinović (footballer) (born 1983), Serbian footballer.
 Milorad Milutinović (1935–2015), Yugoslav Serbian footballer.
 Miloš Milutinović (1933–2003), Yugoslav Serbian footballer and coach.
 Miroslav Milutinović (born 1985), Serbian footballer.
 Sima Milutinović Sarajlija (1791–1847), Serbian intellectual and diplomat.
 Sima Milutinović (1899–1981), Yugoslav mechanical engineer and a professor.
 Zdravko Milutinović (born 1951), retired Yugoslav sports shooter. 
 Zoran Milutinović (born 1988), Bosnian footballer.

Serbian surnames